Andychristyite (IMA symbol: Acs) is a lead copper tellurate mineral with the chemical formula PbCuTeOHO. Its type locality is the Soda Mountains in California. It was named after Welsh–Australian mineralogist Andrew G. Christy.

References 

Lead minerals
Copper(II) minerals
Tellurate and selenate minerals
Minerals described in 2016